Refat Abdurahman oglu Chubarov (born 22 September 1957) is a Ukrainian politician and public figure, leader of the Crimean Tatar national movement in Ukraine and worldwide.

Biography
Chubarov was born on 22 September 1957 in Samarkand, Uzbek SSR in the family of Crimean Tatar Abduraman Seitasan oglu Chubarov (1931-2014) who was deported in 1944 by the Soviet authorities from his native village of Ay Serez (today Mizhrichia, Sudak Municipality). In 1968, the Chubarov family was allowed to return, but not to the Southern coast of Crimea, so the family settled in Pryvilne (Krasnoperekopsk Raion).

In 1983 Chubarov graduated from the Moscow State Historic-Archive Institute. After graduation and until September 1990 he worked at the Central State Archives of the October Revolution and the Socialist Construction of Latvian SSR in Riga. From 1989 to 1991, Chubarov was a regional representative at the Riga city council, as a member of the Popular Front of Latvia faction which favoured Latvian independence from the Soviet Union.

Since November 2013 he has served as the chairman of the Mejlis of the Crimean Tatar People. He served as Deputy Chairman of the Supreme Council of Crimea from 1995 to 1998 and as People's Deputy of Ukraine from 1998 to 2007. He also has served as the President of the Worldwide Congress of Crimean Tatars since 2009. In 2014, he called the Crimean status referendum "a circus" and also said that it is "a tragedy, an illegitimate government with armed forces from another country". In the aftermath of the referendum Russia annexed Crimea on 18 March 2014.

In June 2014, Chubarov vowed to boycott the September 2014 Crimean parliamentary election.

From 15 May 2015, Chubarov was a member of the Verkhovna Rada (Ukraine's parliament) as a member of the Petro Poroshenko Bloc. He was placed #71 on this party's election list during the 2014 Ukrainian parliamentary election.

In November 2015 Russia unsuccessfully tried to place Chubarov on the Interpol search list, after a Ukrainian query not to admit this request. Russia accused Chubarov of calling for secession of Crimea from Russia.

The Mejlis of the Crimean Tatar People was labeled an "extremist organisation" and subsequently banned by Crimea's supreme court on 26 April 2016.

Chubarov again took part in the July 2019 Ukrainian parliamentary election, this time for the party Strength and Honor. But in the election the party won 3.82%, not enough to clear the 5% election threshold and thus got no parliamentary seats.

Notes

References 

1957 births
People from Samarkand
Living people
People of the Euromaidan
Uzbekistani emigrants to Ukraine
Russian State University for the Humanities alumni
Popular Front of Latvia politicians
People's Movement of Ukraine politicians
Reforms and Order Party politicians
Independent politicians of Petro Poroshenko Bloc
Independent politicians of Our Ukraine Bloc
Third convocation members of the Verkhovna Rada
Fourth convocation members of the Verkhovna Rada
Fifth convocation members of the Verkhovna Rada
Eighth convocation members of the Verkhovna Rada
Recipients of the Order of Merit (Ukraine), 1st class
Recipients of the Order of Merit (Ukraine), 2nd class
Recipients of the Order of Prince Yaroslav the Wise, 5th class
Recipients of the Order of Prince Yaroslav the Wise, 4th class
Ukrainian exiles of the annexation of Crimea by the Russian Federation
Crimean Tatar independence activists
Crimean Tatar politicians